Alison Ruth Mercer  (born 1954) is a New Zealand zoologist based at the University of Otago, with a particular interest in the brain physiology of bees. She was elected a member of the National Academy of Sciences in 2022.

Education 
Mercer received her PhD in zoology in 1979 from the University of Otago. Her thesis Visceral innervation in molluscs was concerned with molluscs.

Academic career
She has been an emeritus professor at the University of Otago since 2018. Her research interests span from understanding the brain and behaviour of honey bees, development genetics, as well as learning and memory.

She has repeatedly made headlines in the popular press with her studies of the effects of chemicals on bees. She was nicknamed the "Queen of all pheromones" by Otago Daily Times for her work in discovering that exposing a young bee to the pheromone of a queen bee actually alters the composition of the young bee's brain. She has also published on the varroa mite a problematic parasite of honeybees.

Awards and honours 
In the 2008 Queen's Birthday Honours, Mercer was appointed an Officer of the New Zealand Order of Merit, for services to science.

In 2022, Mercer was elected as a member of the National Academy of Sciences.

Selected works

References

External links
 "Emeritus Professor Alison Mercer", Department of Zoology, University of Otago

1954 births
Living people
20th-century New Zealand zoologists
New Zealand women academics
University of Otago alumni
Academic staff of the University of Otago
Scientists from Dunedin
New Zealand entomologists
Women entomologists
Officers of the New Zealand Order of Merit
21st-century New Zealand zoologists
Members of the United States National Academy of Sciences